Cale P. Keable (born July 10, 1976) is an American politician and a Democratic member of the Rhode Island House of Representatives representing District 47 since January 2011.
He is married to Colleen Murphy Keable (née) Foley of Medford, MA

Education
Keable earned his BA degree at Providence College and his JD at Harvard Law School.

Elections

2012 Keable and returning 2010 Republican opponent Donald Fox were both unopposed for their September 11, 2012 primaries, setting up a rematch; Keable won the November 6, 2012 General election with 3,201 votes (54.3%) against Fox.
2010 When District 47 Democratic Representative Edwin R. Pacheco left the Legislature and left the seat open, Keable ran in the September 23, 2010 Democratic Primary, winning with 928 votes (63.3%) and won the November 2, 2010 General election with 2,435 votes (52.1%) against Republican nominee Donald Fox.

References

External links
Official page at the Rhode Island General Assembly

Cale Keable at Ballotpedia
Cale P. Keable at OpenSecrets

Place of birth missing (living people)
1976 births
Living people
Harvard Law School alumni
Democratic Party members of the Rhode Island House of Representatives
People from Providence County, Rhode Island
Providence College alumni
Rhode Island lawyers
21st-century American politicians